Lorenzo Campeggio (7 November 1474 – 19 July 1539) was an Italian cardinal and politician. He was the last cardinal protector of England.

Life
Campeggio was born in Milan, the eldest of five sons. In 1500, he took his doctorate in canon and civil law at Bologna and married Francesca Guastavillani with whom he had five children. When she died in 1509, Campeggio began an ecclesiastical career under Pope Julius II's patronage.

He was soon appointed to two diplomatic missions, both against the Council of Pisa, first to the emperor Maximilian I, who gave him the Bishopric of Feltre in 1512 (held until 1520), and then in 1512–13 to the Duke of Milan. In 1513 he returned to Germany seeking a league against the Turks. Pope Leo X made him a Cardinal on 1 July 1517, and Maximilian made him Cardinal–protector of the Holy Roman Empire. On 3 March 1518 he was sent to England as part of Leo's peace policy. This gave Thomas Wolsey the chance to become legate himself by using permission for Campeggio to enter England as leverage, and then to outmanoeuvre the new legate when he arrived, taking over the process of peace-making which led to the Treaty of London in 1519. He was also a member of Johann Goritz's humanist sodality.

Campeggio was appointed cardinal–protector of England on 22 January 1523. He was not involved in much English business, except for the referring of episcopal provisions in consistory. The election of Pope Adrian VI in 1522 cemented his position in the Roman Curia.

Campeggio wrote his De depravato statu ecclesiae for Adrian, which proposed radical reforms for the papal bureaucracy. On 2 December 1524 he received the bishopric of Salisbury, which he had been promised in 1518. The election of Pope Clement VII in 1523 further exalted Campeggio's power. Clement made him bishop of Bologna on 2 December 1523 (held until 1525) and then on 9 January 1524 legate to the Diet of Nuremberg.

During the sack of Rome in 1527, Campeggio lost everything. Clement, who fled to Orvieto, left him behind as papal legate in the city, just when the English political situation required his attention. Wolsey and Henry VIII expected his support for their proposal that a papal co-legate should decide Henry's divorce from Catherine of Aragon in co-operation with Wolsey. Campeggio had, however, already given a legal opinion to the Pontiff supporting the validity of the marriage.

Nevertheless, he was named legate on 8 June 1528, after a joint commission with Wolsey had been agreed on 13 April. Campeggio arrived in London on 8 October 1528 and held the first of many sessions with Wolsey and Henry, the first English King to sue before a papal judge in person.

Campeggio found himself in a difficult position, since Emperor Charles V, Catherine of Aragon's nephew, was determined to prevent the divorce, and was putting pressure on Clement. The deciding point in law for Campeggio was Julius's dispensation for Henry and Catherine's marriage. In Catherine's possession from early in 1528, she showed it to Campeggio in October, and he took it to invalidate his commission, since the latter failed to cover the document. He tried to make the case disappear on 23 July 1529 by proroguing it until October, but this was forestalled by the Pope sending the matter to Rome a week earlier. On his way back to Rome, Campeggio met Charles and Clement in Bologna, where the pope gave Campeggio the castle of Dozza and the Emperor took Campeggio's family under his patronage. Charles later (2 September 1530) gave Campeggio the Spanish bishopric of Huesca and Jaca, which he held until 17 June 1534 when he became bishop of Candia (Crete) (until 1536); in 1532, moreover, when making Campeggio's son Gianbattista bishop of Majorca, the emperor reserved the administration of the see to the young man's father. Campeggio was legate to the Diet of Augsburg in 1530, where he pursued negotiations with Philip Melanchthon.

By 20 May 1531, Henry had dismissed Campeggio as legate. In August 1533, he lost the revenues of Salisbury, and on 21 March 1534 was deprived of the bishopric by act of Parliament; also deprived was Girolamo Ghinucci, Bishop of Worcester.  Campeggio was a member of the commission which excommunicated Henry in 1535. He remained protector of Germany until his death, at the same time devoting much energy to insuring the future of his family; his two sons, two brothers, and one nephew all became bishops. He was named legate to the general council called first at Mantua and then at Vicenza, but he attended only the first session in May 1538. He died on 25 July 1539, aged sixty-four, and was buried in Santa Maria in Trastevere; in 1571 at least some of his bones were transferred to the church of Santi Marta e Bernardino that he had built in Bologna.

References
E. V. Cardinal, Cardinal Lorenzo Campeggio, legate to the courts of Henry VIII and Charles V (1935)
Oxford Dictionary of National Biography

Further reading
Wilkie, William E. 1974. The cardinal protectors of England. Cambridge University Press. .

 

 

 

 

 

 

 

 

 

 

 

 

 

 

 

1474 births
1539 deaths
Apostolic Nuncios to the Holy Roman Empire
Diplomats from Milan
16th-century Italian cardinals
Italian expatriates in England
Bishops of Bologna
Cardinal-bishops of Albano
Cardinal-bishops of Palestrina
Cardinal-bishops of Sabina
Bishops of Salisbury
16th-century English Roman Catholic bishops
16th-century Italian jurists
Italian Renaissance humanists
Burials at Santa Maria in Trastevere
Latin Archbishops of Crete
16th-century Italian Roman Catholic bishops
Clergy from Milan